The Women's 1500 metre freestyle competition of the 2022 FINA World Swimming Championships (25 m) was held on 16 December 2022.

Records
Prior to the competition, the existing world and championship records were as follows.

The following new records were set during this competition:

Results
The slowest heats were started at 12:55, and the fastest heat at 21:16.

References

Women's 1500 metre freestyle
2022 in women's swimming